The Houses of Husbandry Act 1597 (39 Eliz. 1 c. 1) was an Act of the Parliament of England passed during the reign of Elizabeth I. It was declared to be "An Act against the decaying of towns and houses of husbandry".

The Act commanded lords who had let their "houses of husbandry" decay since 1590 to rebuild them. A "house of husbandry" was defined as a house possessing twenty acres of land that had been occupied or let to farm for at least three years during the Queen's reign. The Act ordered that they were to continue in this state "for ever".

Notes

Acts of the Parliament of England (1485–1603)
1597 in law
1597 in England